Hypsipyla ferrealis is a species of snout moth in the genus Hypsipyla. It was described by George Hampson in 1929 and is known from Costa Rica.

References

Moths described in 1929
Phycitini